Marie Bjerg (born 16 July 1988) is a Danish football defender. She plays for IK Skovbakken and the Danish national team.

References
Danish Football Union (DBU) statistics

Danish women's footballers
Denmark women's international footballers
1988 births
Living people
Women's association football defenders
VSK Aarhus (women) players